George Town SC is a football club based in George Town, Cayman Islands, which currently plays in the Cayman Premier League. Its home stadium is the 2,500-capacity T.E. McField Sports Centre.

Former players

  Gary Whittaker
  Miguel Pitta

Achievements
 Cayman Islands League: 3
1996–97, 1998–99, 2001–02

Cayman Islands FA Cup: 4
1997–98, 2001–02, 2009–10, 2010–11

Cayman Islands Digicel Cup: 2
2009–10, 2010–11

CIFA Charity Shield: 1
2010

Performance in CONCACAF competitions

References

Football clubs in the Cayman Islands
Association football clubs established in 1996
1996 establishments in the Cayman Islands
George Town, Cayman Islands